SM48 is the name for class of Soviet diesel locomotives operating in Poland for PKP. The original designation was ТЭМ2 (TEM2), and was the Soviet-built version of the ALCO RSD-1.

History
The SM48 was originally put into service on the eastern Polish railways, where  Russian broad gauge railways were still in use. It turned out that the locomotive fitted well within the structure gauge on standard gauge lines.

Introduction
Since 1976, PKP have bought 130 SM48 locomotives. There are also locos in service with other Polish operators: PCC Rail, PTKiGK Zabrze, Kopalnia Piasku Kotlarnia.

Modernizations

Since 2010, several locomotives underwent modernization to Newag 15D/16D standard. (PKP Cargo classes them as ST48.)

In 2017, Pesa offered their version of modernization, designated 19D.

In 2021,  offered their version of modernization, designated 20D.

Nicknames
Tamara – from an original USSR name "TEM2"
Walentyna – from a popular female name in USSR

See also
Polish locomotives designation

References

Diesel-electric locomotives of Poland
Co′Co′ locomotives
Railway locomotives introduced in 1976
Standard gauge locomotives of Poland